Kfar Ma'as (lit. Deed Village) is a moshav in central Israel. Located to the south of Petah Tikva on the edge of the Ono Valley, it falls under the jurisdiction of Drom HaSharon Regional Council.

History
The moshav was formed in 1934 by the uniting of two villages, Behadraga and HaYovel.

Notable residents 
Natan Yonatan
Dvora Omer

Gallery

References

Moshavim
Populated places established in 1934
Populated places in Central District (Israel)
1934 establishments in Mandatory Palestine